Denyse Thomasos (October 10, 1964 – July 19, 2012) was a Trinidadian-Canadian painter known for her abstract-style wall murals that conveyed themes of slavery, confinement and the story of African and Asian Diaspora. "Hybrid Nations" (2005) is one of her most notable pieces that features Thomasos' signature use of dense thatchwork patterning and architectural influence to portray images of American superjails and traditional African weavework.

Early life and education 
Born in Port of Spain, Trinidad and Tobago, Denyse Thomasos and her family emigrated to Canada in 1970, settling in Toronto, Ontario. Her father obtained a master's degree in physics from the University of Waterloo and was a high school teacher.

Thomasos received her BFA from the University of Toronto Mississauga where she studied painting and art history.
 Her father died suddenly weeks before she entered graduate school, the grief from this loss influenced her early paintings. Thomasos received her MFA in painting and sculpture from the Yale School of Art in 1989, after attending the Skowhegan School of Painting and Sculpture in Maine, in 1988.

Career and works 
Thomasos was known for architectural structures and wall paintings. Her work was, in part, inspired by travel, slavery and its psychological impact on people of color, and the prison-industrial complex. Thomasos researched and photographed super-max jail sites during the Bush years.

Thomasos won more than twenty awards over the course of her career, including an affiliated fellowship at the American Academy in Rome in 1995 (funded by The Pew Charitable Trusts), a Guggenheim Fellowship in 1997, a Millennium Grant from the Canada Council for the Arts, and the first McMillan/Stewart award from Maryland Institute College of Art (MICA) in 2009. She was awarded fellowships from the New York Foundation of the Arts, and won residencies to Bellagio, Yaddo, and the MacDowell Colony.

She was a professor at the Tyler School of Art at Temple University in Philadelphia, and then (beginning in 1995), Associate Professor of Art at Rutgers University's Arts, Culture and Media Department.

In 1994, Thomasos installed a mural entitled "Recollect" at contemporary artist-run centre Mercer Union in Toronto, Ontario. Her painting "Babylon" (2005) was acquired by Carr Hall at St. Michael's College in Toronto, Ontario.

Thomasos' first solo exhibition was in 1995 at Alpha Gallery in Boston. Her other exhibitions included "Inside" (2015) at Blackwood Gallery at the University of Toronto Mississauga; "60 Painters" (2011) at Humber Arts & Media Studios in Etobicoke, Ontario; "Formerly Exit Five: Portable Monuments to Recent History" (2010) at the University of Saskatchewan College Art Galleries in Saskatoon; "From Superjails to Super Paintings" (2010) at Olga Korper Gallery; "Swing Space: Wallworks" (2007) at the Art Gallery of Ontario; "Tracking: Bombings, Wars & Genocide: A Six Months Journey from New York to China, Vietnam, Cambodia & Indonesia" (2004) at MSVU Art Gallery in Halifax, Nova Scotia; and "Rewind" (2004) at the Art Gallery of Bishop's University in Lennoxville, Sherbrooke, Quebec.

Thomasos' work is in the collection of the Art Gallery of Ontario.

Olga Korper Gallery in Toronto, Ontario hosted a memorial exhibition of her work in November 2012. Another posthumous show, "Urban Jewels," was hosted in 2013 at the MacLaren Art Centre in Barrie, Ontario, curated by Ben Portis.

Personal life 
In 2010, Thomasos married filmmaker Samein Priester at St. Basil's Church in Toronto, Ontario a year after the couple were married at City Hall in New York. The couple adopted their child, Syann, in June 2010.

Death 
Thomasos died suddenly in July 2012 at age forty-seven, due to an allergic reaction during a diagnostic medical procedure.

Further reading

References 

1964 births
2012 deaths
Canadian contemporary painters
University of Toronto alumni
Yale School of Art alumni
People from Port of Spain
Canadian women painters
20th-century Canadian painters
Canadian abstract artists
21st-century Canadian painters
20th-century Canadian women artists
21st-century Canadian women artists
Skowhegan School of Painting and Sculpture alumni